Francis Kosier Newcomer (September 14, 1889 – August 16, 1967) was a decorated officer of the United States Army with the rank of brigadier general. He is most noted for his service as a Governor of the Panama Canal Zone from 1948 to 1952.

Biography

Francis Kosier Newcomer was born on September 14, 1889, in Byron, Illinois as a son of Brigadier General Henry C. Newcomer and his wife Rebecca. He attended the United States Military Academy at West Point and graduated first in his class in June 1913. He was commissioned a second lieutenant in the U.S. Army Corps of Engineers on June 12, 1913.

His first assignment was with the 1st Engineer Battalion, which was stationed at Washington Barracks. Within this capacity, he was appointed to the local United States Engineering School from which he graduated in 1916.

During World War I, Newcomer served as a temporary lieutenant colonel with the 4th Engineers, 4th Division. He was awarded the Distinguished Service Cross for his bravery and leadership in the construction of a foot bridge over the Vesle river near Fismes while under fire on August 5, 1918.

Newcomer served as associate professor in the Department of Mathematics at West Point from August 1919 to August 1924. He later served in Hawaii from 1931 to 1933, commanding the 1st Battalion, 3rd Engineers at Schofield Barracks until July 1933.

Newcomer graduated from the Command and General Staff School in June 1935 and the Army War College in June 1940.

During World War II, Newcomer served as theater engineer for the China Burma India Theater at Chungking from February 1943 to March 1944, earning the Legion of Merit.

Newcomer received a temporary promotion to brigadier general on November 8, 1944. He served as Panama Canal maintenance engineer and lieutenant governor from 1944 to 1948. From 1948 to 1952, Newcomer served as Governor of the Panama Canal Zone. Having reached the mandatory retirement age of 60, he was retired as a colonel on September 30, 1949 and advanced back to brigadier general on the retired list the following day. Newcomer remained on active duty until he completed his term as governor in 1952.

Newcomer and his wife moved to San Antonio, Texas in 1952. He died on August 16, 1967 in Brooke General Hospital at Fort Sam Houston, and was buried at Arlington National Cemetery.

Decorations

References

External links
Panama Canal Authority biography
Generals of World War II

1889 births
1967 deaths
People from Byron, Illinois
United States Military Academy alumni
Military personnel from Illinois
United States Army Corps of Engineers personnel
United States Army personnel of World War I
Recipients of the Distinguished Service Cross (United States)
United States Military Academy faculty
United States Army Command and General Staff College alumni
United States Army War College alumni
United States Army generals of World War II
Recipients of the Legion of Merit
United States Army generals
Governors of the Panama Canal Zone
Military personnel from San Antonio
Burials at Arlington National Cemetery